Elio Aggiano (born 15 March 1972 in Brindisi) is a former Italian racing cyclist.

Career achievements

Major results

1996
1st Trofeo Franco Balestra
1998
1st Trofeo Manacor
1999
1st stage 3 Vuelta a Castilla y León
1st stage 3 Vuelta a Galicia
2000
1st Trofeo Calvià
2002
1st stage 3 Uniqa Classic
1st stage 4 Danmark Rundt
1st stage 5 Tour du Poitou-Charentes
2003
1st stage 3 Giro del Trentino
2005
1st stage 5 Settimana Internazionale di Coppi e Bartali
2006
1st stage 7 Tour de Langkawi

Grand Tour general classification results timeline

References

1972 births
Living people
Italian male cyclists
Sportspeople from the Province of Brindisi
Cyclists from Apulia
20th-century Italian people